The Haemosporida (sometimes called Haemospororida) are an order of intraerythrocytic parasitic alveolates.

Taxonomy
Over 500 species are in this order, organised into four families: the Garniidae, the Haemoproteidae, the Leucocytozoidae, and the Plasmodiidae. The majority of the species lie within three genera: Haemoproteus, Leucocytozoon, and Plasmodium.

The Haemoproteidae and the Plasmodiidae both produce pigment. These families have been placed in the suborder Laveraniina. Neither the Haemoproteidae nor the Leucocytozoidae have an asexual cycle in the peripheral blood. The Garniidae do not produce pigment, but do have an asexual cycle in the blood.

The taxa in detail are:
Family Garniidae
 Genus Fallisia Lainson, Landau & Shaw 1974
 Subgenus Fallisia
 Subgenus Plasmodioides Gabaldon, Ulloa and Zerpa 1985
 Genus Garnia Lainson, Landau and Shaw 1971
 Genus Progarnia Lainson 1995
Family Haemoproteidae
 Genus Johnsprentia Landau, Chavatte & Beveridge 2012
 Genus Haemocystidium Castellani and Willey 1904, emend. Telford 1996
 Genus Haemoproteus Kruse 1890
 Subgenus Haemoproteus
 Subgenus Parahaemoproteus Bennett et al 1965
 Genus Paleohaemoproteus Poinar and Telford 2005
 Genus Sprattiella Landau et al 2012 
 Family Leucocytozoidae
 Genus Leucocytozoon Ziemann 1898 emend. Berestneff 1904, Sambon 1908
 Subgenus Akiba
 Subgenus Leucocytozoon
 Family Plasmodiidae
 Genus Bioccala Landau et al 1984
 Genus Biguetiella Landau et al 1984
 Genus Billbraya Paperna and Landau 1990
 Genus Dionisia Landau et al 1980
 Genus Hepatocystis Miller 1908
 Genus Mesnilium Misra, Haldar and Chakravarty 1972
 Genus Nycteria Garnham and Heisch 1953
 Genus Plasmodium Marchiafava and Celli 1885
 Subgenus Asiamoeba Telford 1988
 Subgenus Bennettinia Valkiūnas 1997
 Subgenus Carinamoeba Garnham 1966
 Subgenus Giovannolaia Corradetti, Garnham & Laird 1963
 Subgenus Haemamoeba Grassi & Feletti 1890
 Subgenus Huffia Garnham & Laird 1963
 Subgenus Lacertaemoba Telford 1988
 Subgenus Laverania Bray 1963
 Subgenus Novyella Corradetti, Garnham & Laird 1963
 Subgenus Nyssorhynchus Poinar 2005
 Subgenus Ophidiella Garnham 1966
 Subgenus Papernaia Landau et al 2010
 Subgenus Paraplasmodium Telford 1988
 Subgenus Plasmodium Bray 1963 emend. Garnham 1964
 Subgenus Sauramoeba Garnham 1966
 Subgenus Vinckeia Garnham 1964
 Genus Polychromophilus Landau et al 1984
 Genus Rayella Dasgupta 1967
 Genus Saurocytozoon Lainson and Shaw 1969
 Genus †Vetufebrus Poinar 2011

Note
The genus Mesnilium is the only group that infects fish. The genus has a single species and has been reported only once. IThis genus may have been mistakenly placed in this genus. DNA studies are likely to be needed to clarify this point.

Several genera infect mammals: Bioccala, Biguetiella, Dionisia, Hepatocystis, Plasmodium, 
Polychromophilus, Nycteria, and Rayella.

The insect vectors of Hepatocystis, Plasmodium and Polychromophilus are Ceratopogonidae, Culicidae, and Nycteribiidae, respectively. The vectors of Nycteria and Rayella are currently unknown. Bioccala also uses Nycteribiidae  as its insect vector.

Rayella is thought to have originated from Hepatocystis.

Other genera that may be related
Chelonplasma

Pirhemocyton although once thought to be a protozoan has since been shown to be intraerythrocytic inclusion bodies due to a viral infection.

Phylogenetics
Morrison has shown using molecular data that the Haemosporidia are nested within the gregarines and that this clade is distinct from the piroplasms. This latter clade is a sister group of the coccidians.

References

 
Apicomplexa orders